This article lists the squads of all participating teams in the 2022–23 FIH Pro League. The nine national teams involved in the tournament were required to register a squad of up to 32 players.

Argentina
The following is the Argentina squad for the 2022–23 FIH Pro League.

Head coach: Mariano Ronconi

Australia
The following is the Australia squad for the 2022–23 FIH Pro League.

Head coach: Colin Batch

Belgium
The following is the Belgium squad for the 2022–23 FIH Pro League.

Head coach:  Michel van den Heuvel

Germany
The following is the Germany squad for the 2022–23 FIH Pro League.

Head coach: André Henning

Great Britain
The following is the Great Britain squad for the 2022–23 FIH Pro League.

Head coach: Paul Revington

India

Netherlands
The following is the Netherlands squad for the 2022–23 FIH Pro League.

Head coach: Jeroen Delmee

New Zealand
The following is the New Zealand squad for the 2022–23 FIH Pro League.

Head coach:  Greg Nicol

Spain
The following is the Spain squad for the 2022–23 FIH Pro League.

Head coach:  Maximiliano Caldas

References

Men's FIH Pro League squads